Chinese Taipei Chess Association is the governing body for chess in the Republic of China, (Taiwan). It is a member of the Chinese Taipei Olympic Committee. It is based in Taipei, Taiwan. Joined FIDE in 2004 (Zone 3.3).

President: Szu-Chuen TSAI (appointed in 2007)
General Secretary: Ko-Fei LIU

External links
 

National members of the Asian Chess Federation
Chess in Taiwan
Chess
Chess organizations